Lake Aluma is a town in Oklahoma County, Oklahoma, United States, and a part of the Oklahoma City Metropolitan Area. The population was 88 at the 2010 census.

Geography
Lake Aluma is located at  (35.531632, -97.448272).

Demographics

As of the census of 2000, there were 97 people, 40 households, and 33 families living in the town. There were 41 housing units at an average density of 163.0 per square mile (63.3/km2). The racial makeup of the town was 92.78% White, 3.09% Asian, and 4.12% from two or more races. Hispanic or Latino of any race were 1.03% of the population.

There were 40 households, out of which 27.5% had children under the age of 18 living with them, 82.5% were married couples living together, and 17.5% were non-families. 12.5% of all households were made up of individuals, and 7.5% had someone living alone who was 65 years of age or older. The average household size was 2.43 and the average family size was 2.67.

In the town, the population was spread out, with 19.6% under the age of 18, 2.1% from 18 to 24, 12.4% from 25 to 44, 47.4% from 45 to 64, and 18.6% who were 65 years of age or older. The median age was 52 years. For every 100 females, there were 106.4 males. For every 100 females age 18 and over, there were 100.0 males.

The median income for a household in the town was $152,674, and the median income for a family was $150,000. Males had a median income of $100,000 versus $31,250 for females. The per capita income for the town was $71,838. None of the population and none of the families were below the poverty line.

References

Oklahoma City metropolitan area
Towns in Oklahoma County, Oklahoma
Towns in Oklahoma